Split Rock Township may refer to:

Split Rock Township, Carlton County, Minnesota
Split Rock Township, Minnehaha County, South Dakota

Township name disambiguation pages